Pilbara Minerals is an Australian lithium and tantalite mining company.

History
Pilbara Minerals was founded in January 2005 as Portland International. It commenced trading in August as an internet and telephone sports bookmaker. Having been renamed Marginbet in April 2007, it was listed on the Australian Securities Exchange in September 2007.

In November 2007 it diversified into gold mining, purchasing two prospecting licences in the Goldfields-Esperance region of Western Australia. In December 2007, the company discontinued its bookmaking business. In April 2008 Marginbet was renamed Fortuna Metals.

In 2009/10, 13 exploration licences in the Pilbara were purchased. In 2012, Pilbara Minerals acquired Sturt Resources that had gold and copper mining interests in Papua New Guinea. In June 2014, Pilbara Minerals acquired a 50% stake in the Tabba Tabba Tantalum project. In July 2014, Pilbara acquired the Pilgangoora Tantalum-Lithium Tantalum project, now known as the Pilgangoora Operation.

In 2020 Pilbara Minerals acquired the Altura lithium project in Western Australia, now part of the Pilgangoora Operation.

Controversies
In 2019, a contractor was charged with murdering a co-worker at the Pilgangoora mine site. The case is now before the court.

References

External links

Companies based in Perth, Western Australia
Companies listed on the Australian Securities Exchange
Gambling companies of Australia
Lithium mining
Mining companies of Australia
Non-renewable resource companies established in 2005
Pilbara
2005 establishments in Australia